is a Japanese manga series by Hiroaki Samura. It has been serialized in Kodansha's seinen manga magazine Monthly Afternoon since July 2014, with its chapters collected in nine tankōbon volumes as of January 2022. The manga is published in North America by Kodansha Comics. An anime television series adaptation produced by Sunrise aired from April to June 2020 on MBS's Animeism block. A television drama adaptation is set to premiere in April 2023.

Plot
Minare Koda, a floor manager at a small restaurant in Sapporo, tries to deal with her bad breakup with an ex-boyfriend. In the process, she drunkenly vents her frustrations to an older man sitting next to her at a local bar. The following day, she discovers that the man works as a producer at a nearby radio station, which broadcast her drunken ramblings over the airwaves. As Minare's voice gains her more attention than her work at the restaurant, she ends up becoming a late-night radio talk show host at the same station, trying to balance her talk show with her daytime life to make ends meet.

Characters

An amateur radio talk show host. She starts out as a waitress at the restaurant Voyager, and often gets into trouble because of her anger management problems. Shortly after breaking up with her ex-boyfriend Mitsuo, she ranted about it and was broadcast over the radio leading her to get fired by the restaurant, as well as get a job opportunity working for a local radio station starting out as a weekly late night talk show host. 

 

Minare's boss at the radio station.

 

Minare's co-worker at the radio station. Minare later moves into her apartment to live with her after getting evicted due to her inability to pay the rent.

 

 

 

A chef at Voyager.

A waitress at Voyager. She begins working there after her brother was at fault for an accident that led to restaurant's manager being hospitalized. She later develops feelings for Chuya.

Manager and lead chef at the restaurant Voyager.

Minare's ex-boyfriend.

Minare's neighbor who lives in the unit below her.

Media

Manga
Wave, Listen to Me! is written and illustrated by Hiroaki Samura. The series began in Kodansha's Monthly Afternoon on July 25, 2014. Kodansha has collected its chapters into individual tankōbon volumes. The first volume was released on May 22, 2015. As of January 21, 2022, nine volume have been released.

In North America, Kodansha USA began releasing the manga digitally on January 24, 2017. Kodansha started publishing the manga in print on May 26, 2020.

Volume list

Anime
An anime television series adaptation was announced on October 8, 2019. The series is animated at Sunrise and directed by Tatsuma Minamikawa, with Shōji Yonemura handling series composition, Takumi Yokota designing the characters and Motoyoshi Iwasaki composing the series' music. It aired from April 3 to June 19, 2020 on the Animeism programming block on MBS, TBS and BS-TBS, as well as HBC. tacica performs the series' opening theme song "aranami", while Harumi contributed to the series' ending theme song "Pride." The show had an advanced screening event for the first two episodes at United Cinema Toyosu in Tokyo on March 22 with Riho Sugiyama, Shinshu Fuji, Manaka Iwami and Sayaka Ohara joining a talk show on stage.

Funimation has the rights to stream the show in North America. In Japan, the show is available via Netflix and Hulu.

Episode list

TV drama
A television drama adaptation was announced on February 21, 2023, starring Fuka Koshiba as Minare Koda. The series is directed by Takashi Sumida, Osamu Katayama, and Hisashi Ueda, based on a screenplay by Kazunao Furuya, and the music is composed by Yuki Hayashi and Shōgo Yamashiro. It is set to premiere on TV Asahi and its affiliates on April 21, 2023.

Reception
Wave, Listen to Me! was nominated for the 9th, 10th and 13th Manga Taishō in 2016, 2017 and 2020, respectively. The series ranked 6th on Takarajimasha's Kono Manga ga Sugoi! guidebook list of 2016 top manga for male readers.

References

External links
 
 

2023 Japanese television series debuts
Anime series based on manga
Anime and manga set in Hokkaido
Animeism
Comedy anime and manga
Funimation
Kodansha manga
Seinen manga
Slice of life anime and manga
Sunrise (company)
TV Asahi television dramas